James Brandon Slater (born September 14, 1999) is an American college basketball player for the Villanova Wildcats of the Big East Conference.

High school career
Slater played basketball for Paul VI Catholic High School in Fairfax, Virginia. At Paul VI, he was teammates with Trevor Keels and Jeremy Roach. As a junior, Slater averaged 15.2 points, seven rebounds and three assists per game. His senior season was cut short by a broken left hand. Slater competed for Team Takeover on the Amateur Athletic Union circuit, playing alongside his future college teammate Justin Moore. A consensus four-star recruit, he committed to playing college basketball for Villanova over offers from Maryland, South Carolina and Miami (Florida).

College career
Slater had a limited role during his first three seasons at Villanova. As a junior, he averaged 3.8 points and 2.2 rebounds in 16.8 minutes per game. He entered the starting lineup in his senior season. On November 16, 2021, Slater scored 23 points in a 100–81 win against Howard. He averaged 8.5 points and 3.7 rebounds per game as a senior, helping the Wildcats reach the Final Four. Slater opted to return for his fifth season of eligibility, taking advantage of the NCAA's decision to offer an additional season due to the COVID-19 pandemic.

Career statistics

College

|-
| style="text-align:left;"| 2018–19
| style="text-align:left;"| Villanova
| 15 || 0 || 3.5 || .222 || .000 || .000 || .6 || .1 || .1 || .2 || .3
|-
| style="text-align:left;"| 2019–20
| style="text-align:left;"| Villanova
| 31 || 0 || 11.6 || .377 || .150 || .400 || 1.3 || .7 || .4 || .2 || 1.6
|-
| style="text-align:left;"| 2020–21
| style="text-align:left;"| Villanova
| 25 || 2 || 16.8 || .493 || .417 || .600 || 2.2 || .5 || .8 || .2 || 3.8
|- class="sortbottom"
| style="text-align:center;" colspan="2"| Career
| 71 || 2 || 11.7 || .426 || .260 || .511 || 1.5 || .5 || .5 || .2 || 2.1

References

External links
Villanova Wildcats bio
USA Basketball bio

1999 births
Living people
American men's basketball players
Basketball players from Virginia
People from Centreville, Virginia
Small forwards
Villanova Wildcats men's basketball players